Megacheira ("great hands", also historically great appendage arthropods) is an extinct class of predatory arthropods defined by their possession of spined "great appendages". Their taxonomic position is controversial, with studies either considering them stem-group euarthropods, or stem-group chelicerates. The homology of the great appendages to the cephalic appendages of other arthropods is also controversial. Uncontested members of the group were present in marine environments worldwide from the lower to middle Cambrian.

Morphology 

Megacheirans are defined by their possession of uniramous "great appendages", which are their first pair of head appendages. The first one or two proximalmost segments/podomeres are spineless (it has been argued that the supposed first of the two proximal podomeres is actually an arthrodial membrane), while the remaining 3-4 more distal podomeres each typically bear a single spine attached towards the distal end of the segment, with the spineless proximal segment/s typically being connected to the spined distal segments by an elbow-like joint, which curled upwards. The great appendages have been interpreted as raptorial limbs involved in predation, with those of some genera such as Yohoia being structurally comparable to the raptorial maxillipeds of mantis shrimp. The spines on the great appendages of leanchoilid megacheirans such as Leanchoilia and Yawunik are elongated into flagella-like structures, suggesting a sensory role alongside predatory function. The body is divided into the head and the trunk. The biramous limbs of megacheirans are homonomous (i.e. having little differentiation from each other), with endopods typically divided into seven segments/podomeres, and paddle-shaped exopods, which are fringed with thin lamellae. The biramous limbs of at least some megacheirans have been suggested to bare exites.

Taxonomy 
Several subdivisions within the group are recognised including Jianfengiidae (including Fortiforceps, Jianfengia, Sklerolibyon and possibly Parapeytoia) which are known from the Early Cambrian of China, as well as the Cheiromorpha (containing at least Yohoia, Haikoucaris, and Leanchoiliidae), known with certainty from the Early-Mid Cambrian of North America, China and Australia, which is distinguished from Jianfengiidae by having a fewer number of body segments (20+ in Jianfengiidae, as compared to typically only 11 to 13 in Cheiromorpha). The monophyly of Megacheira is uncertain, with some studies recovering the group as paraphyletic.

Parapeytoia, which formerly misinterpreted as a radiodont was later suggested to be a member of this group. Possible megacheirans include Enalikter described from the Silurian of the United Kingdom, and Bundenbachiellus from the Early Devonian of Germany; due to their possession of great appendage-like cephalic appendages. However, their relationship to megacheirans has been questioned, due to the uncerain homology of their appendages. Kootenichela has been suggested to be a chimera of various arthropod taxa. Previous inclusion of some "bivalved" genus such as Forfexicaris, Ovalicephalus, and Occacaris to Megacheira was questioned by later investigations. The Late Cambrian Orsten taxon Oelandocaris typically considered to be a crustacean relative, has also been suggested in some studies to be a megacheiran.

Relationship to other arthropods 

Megacheirans are either suggested to be stem-group chelicerates or stem-group arthropods, with the former hypothesis based on the chelicerae-like morphology of the great appendages alongside neuroanatomy and the presence of a reduced labrum resembling those of modern chelicerates, it being argued that chelicerae and the great appendages are homologous structures. Other studies suggest that the megacheirans are stem-group arthropods based on the argument that the great appendages are homologous to the frontal appendages of stem-group arthropods like Isoxys and radiodonts. This identity is disputed, with other authors suggesting that the frontal appendages of radiodonts are homologous to the labrum of modern arthropods.

References

 
Arthropod classes
Prehistoric protostome classes